Melford may refer to:

Places 
Melford (Mitchellville, Maryland), historic plantation home at Bowie, Prince George's County, Maryland, USA
Melford, Nova Scotia, small community in the Canadian province of Nova Scotia, in Inverness County
Long Melford, large village and civil parish in the county of Suffolk, England
Melford Hall, stately home in the village of Long Melford, Suffolk, England
Middle Melford, Nova Scotia, small community in the Canadian province of Nova Scotia, in Guysborough County

Given name 
Melford Spiro (1920–2014), American cultural anthropologist specializing in psychological anthropology
Melford Stevenson (1902–1987), British lawyer and High Court judge who served in many high-profile cases

Surname 
George Melford (1877–1961), American stage and film actor, director, producer, and screenwriter
Michael Melford (1916–1999), sports journalist, primarily writing on cricket but also on rugby union and athletics
Myra Melford (born 1957), jazz pianist and composer
William Melford (1876–1962), fourth head football coach for Washburn University in Topeka, Kansas